Raniganj is a city and municipality in Araria district of the Indian state of Bihar. It is the headquarter of the Raniganj, Araria (community development block).

Governance
Raniganj is the state assembly constituency.

Achmit Rishidev from Janata Dal (United)(JD(U)) party is the MLA representing the Raniganj constituency in the Bihar legislative assembly. He was elected in 2020 Bihar Legislative Assembly election.

Languages
The main language is Hindi. Some residents speak Maithili, Bhojpuri, Urdu, Bengali, or Marwari.

Tourism
Raniganj has the biggest zoo of Bihar (Vriksha Vatika)

Healthcare
Raniganj has one government hospital and many private hospitals and clinics.

Transport
Daily bus service is available from Purnia, Patna, Siliguri, Kolkata, Bhagalpur, Katihar, Birpur, Jogbani, Saharsa, Darbhanga and Muzaffarpur.

Major daily Hindi newspapers include Dainik Jagaran, Hindustan, Dainik Bhaskar, and Prabhat Khabar.

Climate
Raniganj has hot and wet summers and cold and dry winters.

Education
Many government and private school and colleges operate in Raniganj.

Colleges 

 Y.N.P. Inter College
 S.N.V. Inter College
 K.D. College (for bachelors degrees)

Schools 

 Laljee High School Raniganj
 Kalavati Girls High School
 RamanJi Laxmi Saraswati Sishu Mandir
 Seemanchal Public School
 Modern Public School
 Motherland Public School
 Residential Gurukul
 Swarnim Public School
 Residential Paramount
 Shanti Niketan
 Disha Public School
 Govt. Middle School Raniganj
 Govt. Middle School Hasanpur, Ranganj

Coaching institutes 

 Sankalp Science Study Center 
 Lakshaya Classes
 Shanti Niketan Coaching
 Sunrise Coaching Center
 Mathematics Institute
 Rakesh Physics
 Safalta Classes
 Success Point
 Carrer Point Coaching Center
 Lingua English Spoken & Grammar Classes
 Oxford English Classes
 The Classroom For JEE/NEET
 Newton Classes

References

Cities and towns in Araria district